Miranda do Douro or Miranda de l Douro in Mirandese is a city and a municipality in the district of Bragança, northeastern Portugal. The population in 2011 was 7,482, in an area of 487.18 km². The town proper had a population of 1,960 in 2001. Referred to as the "Cidade Museu" of the Trás-os-Montes region, it is located 86 kilometres from Bragança, preserving many of its medieval and Renaissance-era traditions and architecture. It has a language of its own, Mirandese, which enjoys official status in Portugal, in addition to cultural and historical discontinuity with the rest of the Portuguese state. The town is located on the border with Spain, with the Douro River separating the two countries. The nearest town in Spain is Zamora.

The present mayor is Artur Manuel Rodrigues Nunes (Socialist). The municipal holiday is on 10 July.

History

The origin of Miranda do Douro as a populated place is still discussed by historians, but archeologist discoveries give evidence that inhabitants had been living there during the Bronze Age. Around AD 716, the Moors defeated local Visigothic tribes, and occupied some of the lands, calling the area Mir-Hândul.

By the late 11th century, León possessed the region as a stepping-stone to Portugal. The settlement of the village of Miranda developed through the initiative of King Denis, in an area that lay between the lateral slopes of the Douro and Fresno Rivers. It was in Miranda that the Treaty of Alcanices was signed between Denis and Ferdinand IV of Castile, setting the border between the King domingo of Portugal and the Crónica of Castile. Miranda was founded on 18 December 1286, and immediately elevated to the status of vila, with one of its prerequisites declaring that the administrative division would be a Crown fief. From that period forward, Miranda became progressively one of the most important towns that skirted the Trás-os-Montes region.

The Castilians finally occupied Miranda do Douro during the late 14th century, and would remain there until they were expelled by John I of Portugal. On 10 July 1545, King John III elevated Miranda do Douro to the status of city, at the same time becoming the first diocese in Trás-os-Montes (in a papal bull on 22 May 1545 by Pope Paul III, which segmented a major part of the archdiocese of Braga. Miranda, therefore, became the capital of the Trás-os-Montes, seat of the bishopric (that included the residence of the bishop, canons and ecclesiastical authorities), military governorship and civil centre.

In 1762, during the Seven Years' War, the army of Charles III of Spain invaded the Trás-os-Montes. During the course of his invasion, the gunpowder magazine (with over 500 barrels of powder) was hit by a cannon, destroying the four towers of the castle and many of the barrios in the vicinity. Approximately a third of the city's population (about 400 residents) were killed, resulting in the ruin of the religious, demographic and urbanized portion of Miranda. It was almost two years later (1764) that friar Aleixo Miranda Henriques (then the twenty-third bishop) would abandon Miranda, moving to Bragança, which had become a rival episcopal seat in the northeast part of Portugal. By 1680, it was the only ecclesiastical seat in the region.

The area was served by a narrow gauge railway, the Sabor line (Linha do Sabor), which ran over 100 km between Duas Igrejas-Miranda and the southern terminus at Pocinho, where connections could be made to the main line to Oporto. The Sabor line closed in 1988.

Geography

Physical geography
Miranda do Douro is located in a region that skirts the border between the Portuguese Trás-os-Montes region, and the Spanish autonomous community of Castile and León. The relief in this region is influenced by hard quartzite deposits near the border region, making erosion difficult, resulting in high escarpments and cliffs. The soils are composed of schists and granite bedrocks.

Ecoregions/Protectet areas

It was created on 11 May 1998 to encompass the constituent territories that encompass the Rivers  Douro and Águeda, along the Spain-Portugal border that include similar geological and climatic conditions, and to help support flora and fauna in the region, while allowing appropriate human activities. The creation of the complementary Parque Natural de Arribes in Spain, allowed the systematic protection of an area that encompassed the larger ecosystem and biome.

Climate
Miranda do Douro has a Mediterranean climate with continental influences. Due to its location in the Nordeste Transmontano, the area experiences extreme weather fluctuations. It is common for locals to refer to the climate in this region in these terms: Em Miranda há nove meses de Inverno e três de Inferno ("In Miranda there are nine months of winter and three months of Hell"). The summer tends to be dry and warm, while the winters are rigorously cold with frequent snowfalls.

Human geography

Administratively, the municipality is divided into 13 civil parishes (freguesias):
 Constantim e Cicouro 
 Duas Igrejas
 Genísio
 Ifanes e Paradela
 Malhadas
 Miranda do Douro
 Palaçoulo
 Picote
 Póvoa
 São Martinho de Angueira
 Sendim e Atenor 
 Silva e Águas Vivas
 Vila Chã de Braciosa

Twin towns – sister cities

Miranda do Douro is twinned with:
 Aranda de Duero, Spain
 Bimenes, Spain

Culture
The city has been isolated from the rest of the country for many centuries, so the ancestral way of life is still vivid in the traditions and even in the language (see below). Apart from the distance, the weather conditions are also an adversary, as it is very cold and snowy in winter, and very dry and hot in summer.

Gastronomy is one of the local hallmarks, well within the tradition of Trás-os Montes. "Posta à Mirandesa", a heavy, thick steak, is the traditional dish, known and imitated through the rest of the country. The wine from the region has a high alcoholic graduation (17–18°) and matches the regional cuisine well.

The city's old quarter, with the cathedral, dates back to the Middle Ages.  Most houses are small and one story high. Inside the old city proper lie the town hall and museum, the "Museu da Terra de Miranda" (museum of the lands of Miranda), which has displays of  archaeological findings, farm life, local clothing, and traditional masks.

The city has no industries but depends on commercial activity, mainly the sale of house textiles and cutlery from the village of Palaçoulo. Spaniards come in great number on holidays and weekends. There are several hotels, among them the Pousada de Santa Catarina, which overlooks the Douro River.

Mirandese language

The surrounding area is home to the speakers of Mirandese (Mirandês), a language of the Astur-Leonese family, related to Asturian and Leonese. Mirandese was recognised in 1999 by the Portuguese state as co-official with Portuguese for local matters, and an estimate of between 10,000 and 15,000 people speak the language.

Notable citizens
 Leonel Vieira (born 1969) film director in late 20th and early 21st century; filmed the video Rosa Branca for fadist Mariza.

See also
Kingdom of León
Leonese language
Planalto Mirandes IPR
Terra de Miranda

References

External links

City government official website
Photos from Miranda do Douro
Pauliteiros de Miranda Mirandese culture (in Portuguese)

Municipalities of Bragança District
Cities in Portugal
Populated places in Bragança District